Banarasi Babu is a 1973 Hindi film directed by Shankar Mukherjee. The film stars Dev Anand, Raakhee,  Yogeeta Bali, I. S. Johar, Jeevan. The movie was a hit on its release.

Plot
Orphaned Sohan Lal is a wealthy businessman based in Bombay. While on vacation in Kashmir, he meets with beautiful Neela, and after a few misunderstandings both fall in love, and get married. When they return to Bombay, his Manager, V. K. Saxena asks him to travel to London for some business, which he does. Three months later when he returns home, he finds that Neela has not come to receive him at the airport, then on the way home, he is attacked, abducted, and placed in a cell, where a woman, Gulabiya, tells him that she is his sweetheart. With her help he manages to escape, has an accident, ends up in hospital, where he gets to meet a woman who calls him her son. Baffled and exasperated at these turn of events, he returns home to get a very cold response from Neela, who is about to inherit Rs.70 Lakhs from her deceased uncle. While Sohan decides to find out what exactly is going on, and why his life is in shambles, he does not know that this knowledge may well cost him his life.

Cast
 Dev Anand as Sohan / Mohan (Double Role)
 Raakhee as Neela
 Yogeeta Bali as Gulabiya
 I. S. Johar as Kishan / Jackpot
 Jeevan as V. K. Saxena
 Veena as Sohan & Mohan's Mother
 Manorama as Monica
 Master Bhagwan as Dada
 Faryal as Rita
 Raj Rani as Sohan's Foster Mother
 Shivraj as Advocate Dutt
 Marutirao Parab as Dada's sidekick

Soundtrack
The movie boasts one of the best performances of Kishore Kumar, Lata Mangeshkar, Asha Bhosle. Banarasi Babu marked the score as some of the best music composed by duo Kalyanji-Anandji and pro memoria lyrics of Rajendra Krishan.

References

External links 
 

1973 films
1970s Hindi-language films
Films scored by Kalyanji Anandji